The Special Representative of the Secretary-General for Kosovo (SRSG) is appointed by the Secretary-General to lead the United Nations Interim Administration Mission in Kosovo (UNMIK). The Joint Interim Administrative Structure and then the Provisional Institutions of Self-Government held their authority under United Nations Security Council Resolution 1244, reporting to the Special Representative.

List of Special Representatives

See also
Special Representative of the Secretary-General
High Representative for Bosnia and Herzegovina

History of Kosovo
United Nations Mission in Kosovo